Hinundayan, officially the Municipality of Hinundayan (Kabalian: Lungsod san Hinundayan;), is a 5th class municipality in the province of Southern Leyte, Philippines. According to the Hinundayan has a total land area of 6,108 hectares or 61.08 square kilometers, comprising 17 barangays.  2020 census, it has a population of 12,398 people.

Etymology
During the 17th century, there were Spanish sailors who by chance arrived at our shores in Barangay Sabang.  At that time, the fisherfolks and villagers were very busy setting up "handayanans" or resting place for their outrigger canoes. These handayanans were made up of posts with horizontal rails which were a meter high from the ground where the canoes and other sea crafts were laid after use. When the Spanish sailors asked the villagers what was the name of the place, the villagers who were oblivious of the strange language thought that they were asked of what they were doing, so they simply answered in their own dialect, "handayanan among gibuhat para sa among baruto." The Spaniards noted the first word "Handayanan" as the name of the place, so they refer the place as such, which was later on distorted to "Hinundayan". Since then, this place was called Hinundayan.

History

Foundation
Before Hinunangan became a town, this and Hinundayan were part of the town of Abuyog. But when it was created a town on the 18th century, Hinundayan was part of its jurisdiction.

On March 21, 1876, the Governor of Leyte Jose Fernandez issued an Executive Order proclaiming Hinundayan a separate town, the first “Kapitan Municipal” was Don Sotero Tobio.  But its townhood lasted only until the Revolutionary Period.  When the American came, it became a barrio of Hinunangan again.  The “Kapitan Municipal” at that time was Don Luis Lagumbay.

Due to the petition of some concerned Hinundayanons, Executive Order No. 59 was issued on July 31, 1909, signed by Governor General William Cameron Forbes and Act No. 986 proclaiming Hinundayan a separate town from Hinunangan.

Geography

Barangays
Hinundayan is politically subdivided into 17 barangays.

Climate

Demographics

Among the seventeen (17) barangays of the municipality, four (4) barangays are considered urban and the remaining thirteen (13) barangays are rural.  Based on the Philippine Statistics Authority (NSO), 2007 Census of Population, the municipality's population is dispersed in the rural barangays with a total population count of 7,692 or 66% of the total population while the remaining 34% or the 3,918 population count is concentrated in the urban barangays.

Economy

See also
Naval Base Hinundayan

References

External links
 Hinundayan Profile at PhilAtlas.com
Unofficial Website of Hinundayan
Official Website of Hinundayan
 [ Philippine Standard Geographic Code]
Philippine Census Information
Local Governance Performance Management System

Municipalities of Southern Leyte